Temirgoye (Temirquyu) is a rural locality (selo) in Kumtorkalinsky District, Republic of Dagestan, Russia. The population was 1,916 as of 2010. There are 15 streets.

Geography 
Uchkent and Novy Chirkey are the nearest rural localities.

Nationalities 
Avars, Kumyks and Russians live there.

References 

Rural localities in Kumtorkalinsky District